After Romeo was a band based in Los Angeles, California. After Romeo was formed in late 2012 by Drew Ryan Scott, Jayk Purdy, and T.C. Carter after their previous band, Varsity Fanclub, was disbanded. The band consisted Drew Ryan Scott, Jayk Purdy, T.C. Carter, Blake English, and Devin Fox. 

After signing with Sony Music Japan, the group released an album titled "The Story Continues..." exclusively in Japan. After Devin Fox's departure, the group rebranded and released the "Good Things" EP on all streaming platforms. The band disbanded in 2017.

History

2012-2013: Formation and Debut
In February of 2012, Varsity Fanclub was officially disbanded after their Germany tour due to David Lei Brandt leaving the group to tour with Lady Gaga. Shortly after the speculation of David’s departure, a video was posted on Varsity Fanclub’s YouTube page asking fans to help them pick a new name for them so they can rebrand in the United States. After months of waiting, the band revealed their new name: After Romeo. With this rebranding, ex-VFC members Drew Ryan Scott, Jayk Purdy, and T.C. Carter introduced two new members of the group: Blake English and Devin Fox. Blake English was introduced to the other members via T.C. Carter, as the two of them were childhood friends who grew up together in Georgia. Devin Fox was recruited by Drew Ryan Scott after Scott spoke at a performing arts school in Los Angeles. Scott claimed that he was a guest speaker at the school to talk about song writing and that’s when he saw Devin. The group met up with Devin and his mother for dinner and as Scott claims, “…the rest is history.” 

After several weeks of songwriting, recording, and rehearsals, the group officially signed with Jonnie Forster’s 4SOUND Label. 

The group planned to release “Free Fall” as their first studio single. Since the group was recently formed, they were not in a financial position to film a high-budget production for their music video. Drew Ryan Scott funded the project out of his own pocket. Prior to the release of the music video, Jayk Purdy cold-called the Vevo headquarters under his alias “Ryan Hill” to convince them to advertise the video on the Vevo homepage. Much to everyone’s surprise, Vevo accepted the offer and even cross-promoted the group’s video on One Direction’s Vevo page. The music video reached number one on the MTV music chart and was featured in an internationally broadcast advertisement.[3] In February 2014, After Romeo was launched in the Italian music market.[4] 

In 2012, the group performed at the SXSW – Rags 2 Riches event. Their performance was universally panned and the group subsequently had any video of the performance removed from YouTube – stating that it was “not a fair representation” of what they were capable of. 

Soon after, the group went on to audition for the X-Factor, opting to perform an acoustic rendition of One Direction’s “What Makes You Beautiful”. The judges were not impressed – pointing out the group’s uneven make-up and even suggested that some of the members were older than they led on (which was later proven to be correct).

2014-2015: The Bully-Proof Tour and the ‘Love on Lock EP'
In 2014, After Romeo partnered with several artists on a 300-school and 35-mall Bully Proof Tour, where they traveled across the country to give daily performances and to educate fans about the issue of bullying in hopes to establish a bully-free community. Each member of the group stood before students and parents to share their own experiences with bullying and the negative long-term effects that may come out of it. 

The group released their first unofficial EP entitled the “Love on Lock EP” exclusively for those who attended their Bully Proof concerts. The track list included the songs: Love on Lock, On Our Side, One Night, Mr. Impatient, Meet Me in my Dreams, Love on Lock (Acoustic), and Love on Lock (Instrumental). The EP was not released on any streaming platforms. 

The group partnered up with David Lehre to produce their music videos for ‘Love on Lock’ and ‘Juliet’.

2015: Japan Tour and ‘THE STORY CONTINUES…’
In 2015, After Romeo signed a major record deal with Sony Japan for their Asian territory tours. With Sony, the group was able to reach a new audience via Vogue Japan interviews, exclusive YouTube videos, and a new tour. The tour garnered major attention for the group, allowing them to release their debut album “The Story Continues…” The album was released exclusively in Japan, with hopes to release a US version of the album once the tour was done. 

The Japanese release of the album notably left out the songs ‘Thirsty,’ ‘Superhuman,’ and ‘Fight for Love.’ Drew explained in an interview that the songs were replaced with ‘Hard to Get,’ ‘Overnight,’ and ‘Tokyo 2 LA’ because they wanted to introduce J-Rock-sounding tracks for the Japanese market. The latter tracks were scheduled to be included in the US release of the album (which was shelved).

2015-2016: Rebranding and the ‘GOOD THINGS’ EP
Following the departure of Devin Fox, the group decided to take the time to rebrand themselves.

The group then released their single, “Where the People Go,” which was a major departure from their usual pop sound. The song was written by Drew Ryan Scott and Blake English during the writing camp and was eventually presented to the other members. It was at this point where the group focused on shifting their sound from generic "bubble-gum" pop music to indie pop with folk and R&B influences. The Pop nation tour served as a taste of their new sound going forward, as they performed remixes of their songs “Free Fall,” “Love on Lock,” as well as a new song called “Handmade.” 

After the Pop Nation tour completed its run, the group became part of Macy’s iHeartRadio Rising Star campaign, which featured 25 artists that had the opportunity to win the chance to open the 2016 iHeartRadio Music Festival in Las Vegas. After Romeo took this opportunity to announce their new EP: “Good Things.” The group’s new sound was more mature and aesthetically pleasing compared to their original boyband image. Drew Ryan Scott claimed that the group had already recorded enough material to complete an entire album but opted to distribute an EP first to test the waters. 

Their first single, “Convenience” took a giant leap into the band’s maturity from a production, vocal, and lyrical perspective. The song itself caused a major stir within the industry as some of the biggest pop stars were competing to make “Convenience” their own. The “Good Things” EP was critically acclaimed and had positive reviews – showing that the group had a bright future ahead of them.

The group partnered up with Samsung to star in a world-wide commercial promoting the Samsung Galaxy S7 – which included a VR headset feature. After Romeo was featured on Billboard as well as the AOL Build Series.

2017: Disbanding
The group disbanded in 2017 with no formal announcement.

Discography

Singles 
 Free Fall (2013)
 Save Some Snow (2013)
 Love on Lock (2014)
 Where the People Go (2015)
 Thank You (2015)
 Souvenir (2015)
 Meet Me in My Dreams (2015)
 Good Things (2016)
 Convenience (2016)
 Good Things (Dave Audé Remix) (2016)
 Pull Over (Remix) (feat. Silentó) (2016)
 Shut Up (and Kiss Me) (2017)
 How It Happens (2017)

Albums 
The Love On Lock EP (2014)
We’re Coming Home (2014)
The Story Continues... (2015) (Japan)
Good Things EP (2016)

References

External links 
 

American pop music groups
American boy bands
2012 establishments in California
2017 disestablishments in California
Musical groups from Los Angeles